Conkey is a surname. Notable people with the surname include:

 John Conkey, the owner of the Boston Red Stockings of the National League in 1872
 Margaret Conkey (born 1943), archaeologist
 William Conkey (1717–1788), innkeeper of Pelham, Massachusetts in the 18th century

See also
 Conkey House, an 1842 historic home in Niagara County, New York